Abraham Judah ha-Kohen Schwartz (1824–1883), also known by his responsa as the Kol Aryeh, was one of the leading Hungarian rabbis of the nineteenth century.

He was a student of Moses Sofer and Benjamin Wolf Low. From 1861 to 1881 he served as the Rabbi of Beregszasz, Hungary and then until 1883 in his native town of Mad. He was an active participant in the rabbinical gathering in Nagymihaly in 1866 and at the congress held in Budapest in 1869.

Although Rabbi Schwartz studied in the Pressburg Yeshiva whose leaders were opposed to Hasidism, he became deeply attached to Hasidism after a visit he made to Chaim Halberstam, the founder of the Sanz hasidic dynasty.

His son Naftali Schwartz (1843–1896) succeeded him as rav of Mád. 
Schwartz wrote only one work titled Kol Aryeh, but its influence on the rabbis of Hungary was great. One of his great-grandchildren, Dov Ber Spitzer (son-in-law of Chaim Zvi Ehrenreich (1875-1936), Rabbi of Mad from 1932 to 1936), wrote his biography, published under the title Toldos Kol Aryeh (1940). See also "Hakol Aryeh", circa 2004.

References

 
  Hebrew biography

1824 births
1883 deaths
19th-century Hungarian rabbis
Kohanim writers of Rabbinic literature